The Gallerist is a 2015 worker placement strategy board game published by Eagle-Gryphon Games and designed by Vital Lacerda.

Awards 

 2015 Cardboard Republic Tactician Laurel Winner

References

External links 

 

Board games introduced in 2015
Worker placement board games